The 1901 Harvard Crimson football team was an American football team that represented Harvard University as an independent during the 1901 college football season. In its first season under head coach Bill Reid, the team compiled a 12–0 record, shut out nine of 12 opponents, and outscored all opponents by a total of 254 to 24. 

When Harvard met Yale at season's end, it was considered to be for the national championship by the contemporaneous media. Harper's Weekly (photo below) and the Chicago Tribune recognized the team as national champions. In addition, the team was retrospectively named as the national champion by two selectors, the Billingsley Report and Parke H. Davis. Three other selectors, the Helms Athletic Foundation, Houlgate System, and the National Championship Foundation retrospectively named Michigan as the 1901 national champion. A modern authority on college football rankings said, "Indeed, had there been an AP poll in 1901, Harvard would have been #1 by a landslide."

Nine Harvard players received first-team honors from Walter Camp (WC) or Caspar Whitney (CW) on the 1901 All-America team: 
 Fullback Thomas Graydon (WC-1, CW-1); 
 Halfback Robert Kernan (WC-1, CW-1); 
 Halfback A. W. Ristine (WC-2); 
 Tackle Oliver Cutts (WC-1, CW-1); 
 Tackle Crawford Blagden (WC-2; CW-1); 
 Guard William George Lee (WC-1, CW-2); 
 Guard Charles A. Barnard (WC-2, CW-1); 
 End Dave Campbell (WC-1, CW-2); and 
 End Edward Bowditch (WC-2, CW-1).

Schedule

References

Harvard
Harvard Crimson football seasons
College football national champions
College football undefeated seasons
Harvard Crimson football
1900s in Boston